President of Korea may refer to:
President of South Korea
President of the Constitutional Court of Korea (South Korea)
President of North Korea
President of the State Affairs Commission (North Korea)
President of the Presidium of the Supreme People's Assembly (North Korea)
Eternal President of the Republic (North Korea)